Mummy Mee Aayanochadu  is a 1995 Telugu-language comedy film, produced by B. Vanaja, C. Kalyan under the Sri Ammulya Art Productions banner and directed by K. Ajay Kumar. It stars Rajendra Prasad, Indraja and Keerthana, with music composed by Vidyasagar. The film was recorded as a flop at the box office.

Plot
The film begins on Satish (Rajendra Prasad) a young & energetic guy, son of a multi-millionaire Anand Rao (Kota Srinivasa Rao). Anand Rao is debauchery and wants his son to follow his path. But Satish's ambition is to marry a beautiful decent girl and entrust the job to a marriage broker Achary (A.V.S.). But con Achary traps him through a fascinating girl Sangeeta (Keerthana) daughter of a greedy woman Rajyalakshmi (Y. Vijaya). Actually, Satish has a weakness that whenever he drinks, loses control and forgets his deeds when he comes back to consciousness. Rajyalakshmi exploits it, by falsifying that Satish has molested Sangeeta when he decides to marry her. On that occasion, Satish throws a bachelor party and again drinks. The next day morning, surprisingly, a girl Sarada (Indraja) claims herself as his wife whom he has married the previous night. Now Satish wants to discard her and plays various tricks along with Sangeeta & Rajyalakshmi which misfires. After a few comic incidents, Satish learns the reality of Sangeeta & Rajyalakshmi, the virtue of Sarada and seeks for the truth. Here, Sarada takes him to a wise lady Vasundhara (Manju Bhargavi), his mother who left Anand Rao because of his immorality. Indeed, she only assigned Sarada to protect her son. At last, Satish makes a play, makes Anand Rao realize his mistake and reunites the parents. Finally, the movie ends on a happy note with the marriage Satish & Sarada.

Cast
Rajendra Prasad as Satish
Indraja as Sarada
Keerthana as Sangeeta
Kota Srinivasa Rao as Anand Rao
Brahmanandam as Potti Rayudu / Basha / Big Boss / Khan Dada / Prabhu Deva
Tanikella Bharani as Inspector Extra Venkat Rao
A.V.S. as Achary
Sivaji Raja
Gundu Hanumantha Rao as Antharangam
Kallu Chidambaram as Lawyer
Manju Bhargavi as Vasundhara
Latha Sri
Y. Vijaya as Rajyalakshmi

Soundtrack

Music composed by Vidyasagar. Music released on Supreme Music Company.

References

Films scored by Vidyasagar
1990s Telugu-language films